Lalain (also Romanized as Lālā’īn; also known as Īralaīn and Lālān) is a village in Nur Ali Beyk Rural District, in the Central District of Saveh County, Markazi Province, Iran. At the 2006 census, its population was 403, in 100 families.

References 

Populated places in Saveh County